Václav Bouška (21 August 1910 – 20 September 1975) was a former Czechoslovak football midfielder. He played 7 games for the Czechoslovakia national football team.

References

1910 births
1975 deaths
Czech footballers
Czechoslovak footballers
Czechoslovakia international footballers
SK Slavia Prague players
SK Kladno players
Czechoslovak expatriate footballers
Expatriate footballers in France
Czechoslovak expatriate sportspeople in France
Association football midfielders
Olympique Lillois players